Notocydia is a genus of moths of the family Tortricidae.

Species
Notocydia atripunctis (Turner, 1946)
Notocydia lomacula (Lower, 1899)
Notocydia niveimacula Komai & Horak, in Horak, 2006
Notocydia tephraea (Meyrick, 1911)

See also
List of Tortricidae genera

References

External links
tortricidae.com

Tortricidae genera
Olethreutinae
Taxa named by Marianne Horak